Benin competed at the 1980 Summer Olympics in Moscow, USSR.  The nation returned to the Olympic Games after missing the 1976 Summer Olympics.  Previously, the nation competed as Dahomey.

Athletics 

Men

 
Field events

Women

Boxing

Men

References
Official Olympic Reports

Nations at the 1980 Summer Olympics
1980
Olympics